Vradiivka is an urban-type settlement in Pervomaisk Raion of Mykolaiv Oblast in Ukraine. It hosts the administration of Vradiivka settlement hromada, one of the hromadas of Ukraine. Until 1964 the settlement was known as Velyka Vradiivka. Population:  

Vradiivka is located on the right bank of the Kodyma, a right tributary of the Southern Bug.

History
Aryeh Leib Schochet, a Chassidic scholar, became a rabbi in Vradiivka in the 19th century.

In the 1920s, the current area of the district belonged to Odessa Governorate. In 1923, uyezds in Ukrainian Soviet Socialist Republic were abolished, and the governorates were divided into okruhas. In 1923, Velyka Vradiivka Raion with the administrative center in Vradiivka was established. It belonged to Pervomaisk Okruha. In 1925, the governorates were abolished, and okruhas were directly subordinated to Ukrainian SSR. In 1930, okruhas were abolished, and on 27 February 1932, Odessa Oblast was established, and Velyka Vradiivka was included into Odessa Oblast. In February 1954, Velyka Vradiivka Raion was transferred to Mykolaiv Oblast. In January 1963, during the abortive Khrushchyov administrative reform, Velyka Vradiivka Raion was abolished and merged into Kryve Ozero Raion. In 1964, Velyka Vradiivka was renamed Vradiivka. On 8 December 1966 Vradiivka Raion with the administrative center in Vradiivka was established on the lands previously belonging to Kryve Ozero Raion. In 1967, Vradiivka was granted urban-type settlement status.

On 18 July 2020, Vradiivka Raion was abolished as part of the administrative reform of Ukraine, which reduced the number of raions of Mykolaiv Oblast to four. The area of Vradiivka Raion was merged into Pervomaisk Raion.

Vradiivka rape

In June 2013, a rape of a local resident by policemen caused riots in Vradiivka and nationwide, after the authorities initially failed to charge the perpetrators.

On 26 June 2013, two police officers and a taxi driver raped  Iryna Krashkova in Vradiivka and then tried to kill her. The victim survived but with severe injuries. Originally, only one police officer and the taxi driver were arrested. As a result, on 1 July 2013 hundreds of angry protesters stormed the district police department and demanded the arrest of the second officer, who was detained soon after. All three men were sentenced to prison. Since then, "Vradiivka has become a symbol for protests against police crimes and the arbitrariness of the justice system".

Transportation
Vradiivka railway station in the settlement has connections to Pervomaisk and Podilsk.

References

Urban-type settlements in Pervomaisk Raion
Ananyevsky Uyezd